Carol Snow is an American poet.

Life
In 2002, she was resident poet at University of California Berkeley.

She lives in San Francisco.

Awards
 1989 National Poetry Series, for Artist and Model, selected by Robert Hass
 Poetry Center Book Award),
 Joseph Henry Jackson Award in Literature
 Poetry Fund grant
 Pushcart Prize
 National Endowment for the Arts Fellowship.

Works
"Respecting", Electronic Poetry Review

Anthologies

References

External links
Carol Snow", Creative Work Fund

Year of birth missing (living people)
Living people
University of California, Berkeley faculty
Roberta C. Holloway Lecturer in the Practice of Poetry
American women poets
21st-century American women